Thomas Lown (April 5, 1904 – September 22, 1977) was an American boxer who competed in the 1928 Summer Olympics. He was born in New York City.

In 1928, he was eliminated in the first round of the welterweight class after losing his fight to the upcoming silver medalist Raúl Landini. He took part in a total of 14 professional between March 1929 and January 1931, winning 12 (three by knockout).

Lown died in Burnt Hills, New York on September 22, 1977, aged 73.

References

External links 
 Thomas Lown's profile at Sports Reference.com
 

1904 births
1977 deaths
Boxers from New York City
Welterweight boxers
Olympic boxers of the United States
Boxers at the 1928 Summer Olympics
American male boxers